Charitodoron thalia is a species of sea snail, a marine gastropod mollusk in the family Charitodoronidae.

Description

Distribution

References

 Lozouet P. (1991) Mollusca Gastropoda : Eumitra récentes de la région néo-calédonienne et Charitodoron fossiles de l'Oligocène supérieur d'Aquitaine (Mitridae). In: A Crosnier & P. Bouchet (eds), Résultats des Campagnes Musorstom 7. Mémoires du Muséum National d'Histoire Naturelle, ser. A, 150: 205-222

External links
 Cernohorsky W.O. (1976). The Mitridae of the World. Part I. The subfamily Mitrinae. Indo-Pacific Mollusca. 3(17): 273-528
 Tomlin J.R. le B. (1932) Reports on the marine Mollusca in the collection of the South African Museum. 6-8. Families Fasciolariidae, Fissurellidae, Buccinidae. Annals of the South African Museum 30: 157-169

Charitodoronidae
Gastropods described in 1932